The Association for Practical and Professional Ethics (APPE) is a non-proft professional organization that supports research, training, and education in practical and professional ethics. It was founded in 1991 with support from Indiana University and the Lilly Endowment to encourage interdisciplinary scholarship and teaching among educators and practitioners. The association sponsors the Intercollegiate Ethics Bowl. The association was hosted on the Indiana University Bloomington campus until mid-2017, when APPE moved to the Prindle Institute for Ethics at DePauw University in Greencastle, Indiana.

Online resources for members
Members have online access to the following resources:
 Ethically Speaking (newsletter)
 Membership Directory (All membership information)
 Profiles in Ethics (institutional member profiles)
 Optional, with special discount: International Journal of Applied Philosophy (1982–present)

Annual Conference
The Annual Conference of the Association for Practical and Professional Ethics is held in late February or early March each year at a different location in the United States. In 2022, the conference will be held from February 24-27 at the Hilton Cincinnati Netherland Plaza Hotel.

References

External links

Learned societies of the United States
Professional ethics
Organizations established in 1991
Ethics organizations
1991 establishments in the United States